De Grasse is a F67 type large high-sea frigate of the French Marine Nationale specialised in anti-submarine warfare, though she also has anti-air and anti-surface capabilities. She is named after the 18th century admiral count François Joseph Paul de Grasse.

Service history
Between 1994 and 1996, De Grasse and her sister  were refitted with the modern SLAMS anti-submarine system, an active Very Low Frequencies sonar.

In April 2006, De Grasse lost her towed sonar array during an exercise in heavy seas. The incident was reported by the Canard Enchaîné; an investigation was launched to ascertain responsibilities for the loss of the 3 million euro worth sonar array. Meanwhile, the spare sonar of the decommissioned  was fitted on De Grasse.

De Grasse was decommissioned on 5 May 2013 and is now moored in the Penfeld.

Gallery

Sources and references 
  Frégate De Grasse, netmarine.net

Tourville-class frigates
1974 ships
Frigates of France
Ships built in France